Neoechinodiscus kozhevnikovii is a species of lichenicolous (lichen-eating) fungus in the order Helotiales. It is known to occur in Russia, Austria, and Switzerland, where it grows parasitically on lichens in genus Cetraria.

Taxonomy

The fungus was formally described as new to science in 2009 by lichenologist Mikhail Zhurbenko, who placed it in the genus Echinodiscus. The species epithet kozhevnikovii honours the late Dr. Yurii Kozhevnikov, a friend of the author and a "devoted explorer of Arctic wildlife".

The taxon was transferred to the genus Neoechinodiscus after it was discovered that Echinodiscus was an illegitimate homonym that had already been used for other taxa. The replacement name Neoechinodiscus was proposed by Rubén Sierra and Eduardo Molinari-Novoa in 2020.

Description
Neoechinodiscus kozhevnikovii produces plate-like (discoid), sessile apothecia that lack a distinct margin and measure 50–150 μm in diameter and about 50 μm in height. The asci are club-shaped (clavate) with a distinct stalk, contains eight spores, and typically measure 40–50 by 9–13 μm. Ascospores are narrowly oblong in shape, hyaline, lack any septa, often contain oil droplets (guttules), and measure 10–12 by 2.5–3.5 μm.

Habitat and distribution
Originally described from mountain and arctic tundras of Russia, Neoechinodiscus kozhevnikovii has also been recorded from the Lepontine Alps of Switzerland, and the Tyrol of Austria. Known hosts for the fungus are Cetraria islandica and Cetraria laevigata.

References

Helotiales
Fungi described in 2009
Lichenicolous fungi
Fungi of the Arctic